Henry Thomas Petty-Fitzmaurice, 4th Marquess of Lansdowne  (7 January 1816 – 5 July 1866), styled Lord Henry Petty-FitzMaurice until 1836 and Earl of Shelburne between 1836 and 1863, was a British politician.

Background and education
Born Lord Henry Petty-FitzMaurice, he was the second son of Henry Petty-FitzMaurice, 3rd Marquess of Lansdowne, and Lady Louisa Emma, daughter of Henry Fox-Strangways, 2nd Earl of Ilchester. He was educated at Westminster and Trinity College, Cambridge. On the early death of his elder brother the Earl of Kerry in 1836 he became known by the courtesy title Earl of Shelburne.

Political career
After graduation, he entered the Commons as MP for Calne in 1837. He served under Lord John Russell as a Lord of the Treasury from 1847 to 1848. In 1856, he was called up to the House of Lords in his father's barony of Wycombe and was Parliamentary Under-Secretary of State for Foreign Affairs under Lord Palmerston from that year until 1858. On the death of his father in 1863, Lord Shelburne succeeded to his titles and was made a Knight of the Garter a year later.

Family
On 18 August 1840, he married Lady Georgiana Herbert (a daughter of the 11th Earl of Pembroke), but she died six months later. He then married Comtesse Emily de Flahault (the eldest daughter of Charles Joseph, comte de Flahaut and the 2nd Baroness Keith) on 1 November 1843 in Vienna and they had three children:

Henry Charles Keith, Earl of Shelburne (1845–1927), later Marquess of Lansdowne
Lord Edmond George (1846–1935), later Baron FitzMaurice
Lady Emily Louisa Anne (1855–1939), married Col. Hon. Everard Digby, a son of the 9th Baron Digby and had issue

Lord Lansdowne died suddenly from an attack of apoplexy on 5July 1866; his titles were inherited by his eldest son, Henry.

References

External links 
 

1816 births
1866 deaths
Knights of the Garter
Petty-FitzMaurice, Henry
Petty-FitzMaurice, Henry
Petty-FitzMaurice, Henry
Petty-FitzMaurice, Henry
Petty-FitzMaurice, Henry
Lansdowne, M4
Whig (British political party) MPs
4
Earls of Kerry